The 2022 ISA World Surfing Games took place in Huntington Beach, California, from September 16 to 24, 2022. The event was organized by the International Surfing Association (ISA), and it was the first time it had been held in "Surf City, USA" since 2006.

Medal summary

Medalists

Medal table

Olympic qualification

The event counted towards qualification for the 2024 Summer Olympics in Paris (surfing events to be held in Teahupo'o, Tahiti). The winning men's and women's national teams earned a qualification slot for their respective country. This was in addition to the maximum quota of two athletes per country. Japan won a qualification slot for the men's event, while the United States won a qualification slot for the women's event.

Participating nations
The following countries sent delegations to the 2022 ISA World Surfing Games:

See also

2022 ISA World SUP and Paddleboard Championship

References

External links

International Surfing Association

ISA World Surfing Games
ISA World Surfing Games
ISA World Surfing Games
ISA World Surfing Games
ISA World Surfing Games
Surfing competitions in California
International sports competitions in California
Sports in Huntington Beach, California